Thumatha ochracea is a moth in the family Erebidae first described by Otto Vasilievich Bremer in 1861. It is found in the Russian Far East (Middle Amur, Primorye) and Japan.

References

External links

Nudariina
Moths described in 1861